Himba may refer to:

Gabon 
 Himba language

Angola and Namibia
 Himba people
 Himba, the dialect of Herero language spoken by the Himba people

Language and nationality disambiguation pages